Sir William Stevenson  (1805 – 9 February 1863) was a Jamaican-born British colonial administrator who served as the 9th Governor of Mauritius from 20 September 1857 to  9 January 1863.

He was born to one of the oldest English families on Jamaica. He was the son of William James Stevenson of Kingston. His mother (née James) was descended from Colonel Richard James, who was the first person born of English parents in British Jamaica. Stevenson's grandmother (née Lawrence) was descended from Henry Lawrence, President of Cromwell's Council of State, whose son founded a plantation in Jamaica in the 17th century.

Stevenson was a barrister. He first served as superintendent of British Honduras from 1854–1857 before being appointed Governor of Mauritius in May 1857.

He was invested as a Knight Commander of the Order of the Bath in 1862. 

He married a Miss Allwood, and had a son, William Lawrence Stevenson, and a daughter, who married Colonel Sir Francis Marindin. His second wife was Caroline Octavia Biscoe, and their son was Francis Seymour Stevenson, M.P.

He died of dysentery in 1863.

References

1805 births
1863 deaths
Governors of British Mauritius
Knights Commander of the Order of the Bath
Deaths from dysentery
19th-century Jamaican people
Governors of British Honduras